The Garigal National Park is a protected national park that is located within the North Shore and Forest District regions of Sydney, New South Wales, in eastern Australia.

Split into three distinct sections, divided by natural geography, urban development and road infrastructure, the park comprises the valley of Middle Harbour Creek and its tributaries, the slopes along

There are over 35 trails in the park covering 120km, including both authorised bushwalking and mountain-biking trails, and unofficial or unsanctioned tracks.

Etymology and indigenous heritage
The word Garigal is a derivation of the word Carigal or Caregal used to describe the indigenous people who lived in Guringai country, translated in modern English as Ku-ring-gai.

The Guringai people are the traditional custodians of the land now reserved as the Garigal National Park and there is considerable evidence of past Aboriginal activity in the area, with over 100 Aboriginal sites recorded to date, including shelters, cave art, rock engravings, middens, grinding grooves and a possible stone arrangement.

Location

Much of the park is bounded by residential development along the ridge tops and it is easily accessible at numerous points by road and water. Several other conservation reserves and areas of bushland are adjacent or close by the Garigal National Park, including the Ku-ring-gai Chase National Park, the Sydney Harbour National Park, the Manly Warringah War Memorial Park (commonly known as the Manly Dam Reserve) and a number of areas of Crown land and other reserves in Northern Beaches, Ku-ring-gai and Willoughby local government areas.

The national park is defined by the following boundaries
 In the southeastern sectorSurrounding Bantry Bay between Killarney Heights and Forestville to the west; and Wakehurst Parkway and the Manly Dam Reserve to the east.

Features

Fauna
A Dry Sclerophyll Forest, Garigal National Park is home to a wide range of fauna, including birds, snakes and a wide range of native mammals (such as bandicoots, koalas, wallabies).

There is also a number of introduced pests, including rabbits and foxes.

Gallery

See also

 Protected areas of New South Wales

References

External links

 
 
 
 
 
  Walking tracks, MTB trails and swimming holes in Garigal National Park
 
 

National parks of New South Wales
Protected areas established in 1991
1991 establishments in Australia
Urban forests
Parks in Sydney
St Ives, New South Wales